RK Zamet (Rukometni Klub Zamet) is a handball club from Rijeka, Croatia, formed in 1957. The club currently competes in the Croatian Premier Handball League and the Croatian Handball Cup. Although the club has not won any mayor trophies, it has produced four Olympic gold medalists: Valter Matošević, Alvaro Načinović, Valner Franković and Mirza Džomba. Four additional Olympic gold medalists played for the club, including Irfan Smajlagić, Vladimir Šujster, Zlatko Saračević and Božidar Jović, and Jakov Gojun, who has a bronze medal.

History

Origins
The club was founded in September 1957, as RK Partizan Zamet by Prof. Stanko Jerger, Josip Šarić and Vittorio Drog. The players of the first RK Zamet team were Vilim Blažić, Tomislav Blažić, Nelo Stepčić, Vinko Radovčić, Anton Srdoč, Boris Kinkela, Josip Šarić and Stanko Jerger.

Zamet in Yugoslavia (1957–1991)
During the first ten years, real results came in 1966 when Zamet won the Regional League of Primorje and Karlovac. During the 1960s Zamet played at the regional level. In 1969 Zamet's U-14 team won the club's first youth trophy at the Croatian U-14 Championship.

Until 1972, the club played in the Regional League of Primorje and Istra (Primorska regionalna liga), in which they won the championship title in 1966, 1970, and 1972, along with three runner-up titles. In 1972, they started competing in the Third Yugoslav League. In 1977, they were promoted to the Second Yugoslav League and, the following year, Zamet gained promotion to the First Yugoslav League. This decade saw players such as Marijan Seđak, Williams Černeka, Valter Marković, Željko Milanović, Darko Srdoč, Damir Čavlović, Boris Komucki, Renato Sošić and Jurica Lakić who left their marks in Zamet and handball in general. Unfortunately they were relegated after one season in the first league, finishing 14th.

For two seasons the club was renamed Partizan Rijeka from 1977 to 1979, when it was changed to Zamet.

In 1981, Zamet beat long time city rivals RK Kvarner and became Rijeka's top handball club. During the early 1980s, Zamet played in the second division. In 1982 the administration of MRK Zamet (men's team) and ŽRK Zamet (women's team) split up and went their separate ways.

The 1980s saw one of the best generation of players come through the club, such as Darko Dunato, Boris Dragičević, Marin Mišković, Tonči Peribonio, Valter Periša, Vlado Vukoje, Alvaro Načinović, Valner Franković, Mladen Prskalo, Valter Matošević and Drago Žiljak.
 
In 1987, they once again earned promotion to the first division, where they stayed until the breakup of Yugoslavian league in 1991. Their best position in the league was in 1987–88 when they were 8th.

Zamet in Croatia (1991–2014)
Following the independence of Croatia, from 1992, Zamet competed in the top-tier league – Croatian First A League. Their first season in the newly founded league saw a prominent rise of power with them finishing second in the league and reaching the semi-finals of Croatian Cup.

The second place in the league earned Zamet a chance to qualify for their first European competition, in this case the European Champions Cup. Unfortunately Zamet lost in the first round to Pivovarna Laško Celje on aggregate due to one goal, winning the first match and losing the second.

With high expectations from the previous season, the 1992–93 season brought a big shock. Zamet finished 8th with coach Žiljak being replaced mid-season with Darko Dunato, who had retired as a player the previous season. Zamet were also eliminated from the Croatian Cup by Coning Medveščak Zagreb. The next season Žiljak returned as head coach but brought the same results as the season before. Zamet finished 8th.

In the 1994–95 season Zamet were relegated to the First B League, finishing 9th in the league with newly appointed coach Ivan Munitić. Zamet bounced back the next season, finishing first and gaining swift promotion back to the First A League. In this season a new generation of players emerged such as Mirza Džomba, Nikola Blažičko, Renato Sulić, Milan Uzelac, and Igor Saršon. The 1996–97 season saw Zamet in 5th place, a disappointing result due to the fact that they had players such as Valter Matošević and Irfan Smajlagić.

From 1997 to 2000 Zamet changed their name to Zamet Autotrans, due to a sponsorship deal. During this period, Zamet regularly finished near the top of the table.  Ivan Munitić also took Zamet to the quarter-final of EHF City Cup and Round 16 of the EHF Cup Winners' Cup.

In 2000, Zamet signed a new sponsorship deal with Teri-Crotek, changing the club's name to Zamet Crotek for four years. They made it to the Croatian Handball Cup final, where they finished as runners-up in 2000 and 2001. With Damir Čavlović as head coach Zamet played Europe, each season making some of the best results the club saw.

After a successful period, poor results ensued, and during the late 2000s the club often finished in the middle or bottom half of the table. The club was also in financial trouble and often couldn't pay the players their salaries.

In 2011–12 Zamet got to the finals of the Croatian Cup where they lost to Croatia Osiguranje Zagreb. That same season through league results they qualified for the EHF Cup for the first time in ten years. They lost to HK ASA Meso Lovoseice in their first round on aggregate 59–56.

Recent years (2014–present)
On 23 April 2014 Vedran Devčić was appointed as the new president of Zamet. Vedran Babić was appointed as sports director; Damir Balenović, Marinko Blečić, Ivan Krešić, Miljenko Mrakovčić, Igor Načinović, Vjekoslav Sardelić, and Goran Stašek were appointed as board members; and Marin Mišković stayed on as head coach. Zamet had ended their 2013–14 season in 6th place.

Zamet played their 2014–15 season by finishing in 5th place 6 points down from entering the Championship play-offs. During the mid-table play-offs they secured their 7th place. Lovro Jotić was the club's top goal scorer with 147 goals.

On 24 May 2015 it was announced that Mateo Hrvatin would be returning to the club.

Over the summer president Devčić gave out statements that most of the club's debts had been paid, starting the season of on a positive note. Zamet started their season with a six-game winning streak.

On 3 October the club opened up the RK Zamet Hall of Fame, putting up the national team jerseys of Alvaro Načinović, Valter Matošević, Mirza Džomba, Renato Sulić, Nikola Blažičko and Mateo Hrvatin, who were introduced into the Hall of Fame.

Zamet finished their regular season in third place, qualifying for the Championship play-offs for the first time in ten years. Zamet finished in fourth place in the Championship play-offs, qualifying for the EHF Cup qualifiers.

During the summer of 2016 Zamet lost key players Dario Černeka, Dino Slavić, Luka Kovačević, Petar Jelušić and Bojan Lončarić, beginning their season fairly weaker. On 19 May it was announced that Marin Kružić would be returning to Zamet, and they also signed newcomer Tin Lučin.

Zamet started their 2016–17 season with a win against French team Créteil in their first EHF Cup qualifier. The second match was played in Dvorana Zamet, where Zamet, as media outlets said, had "the sweetest loss in history", as they lost 24:27. However, due to the goals scored in the first match, they passed to the next round on aggregate (56:56). Zamet's domestic season didn't start that well, losing their first match to rivals RK Poreč, conceding a draw in their second to RK Dubrava and losing their third to RK Metalac. The first two European matches took a toll on the team. They lost the first match of the second qualifiers to CSM București in București. They equalized in the second match at home and passed through to the third and final stage of the EHF Cup qualification stage. It was revealed on 17 October that Zamet would play their last qualifier against MT Melsungen.

Two days later, on the 19th, Zamet faced Ribola Kaštela at home and entered their first win in the Premier League with a score of 35:28. Their next match was on 22 October where they played against RK Rudar away in Rude, where they won a tight match (25:28).

Venue

Since the foundation of the club matches were played on the playground Zamet when field handball was played. From 1973 until 2009, they played in Dvorana Mladosti, located in the suburb of Trsat.

As of 2009 the club has been playing in Centar Zamet. The capacity of the venue is 2,350 spectators.

Seasons

Since the beginning of Croatian handball in 1992 Zamet has competed at the highest level in the First A League, later renamed First League and now Premier League. They spent one season in the First B League in 1995–96 after being relegated.

1 The season was voided due to COVID-19 pandemic.

Team

Current squad
Squad for the 2017–18 season

Goalkeeper
 1  Wang Quan
 12  Fran Lučin
 16  Marin Sorić

Wingers
RW
 5  Martin Mozetić
 6   Jakov Mozetić
LW
 2  Damir Vučko
 4  Dario Jeličić
 20  Dujam Dunato

Line players
 13  Veron Načinović
 19  Ivan Majić

Back players
LB
 7  Luka Grgurević 
 14  Zhao Chen

CB 
 9  Nikola Njegovan
 17  Antun Dunato
 22  Marko Mrakovčić
 23  Matija Golik

RB
 11  Marin Kružić
 15  Matija Starčević

Technical staff

  President: Vedran Devčić
  Sports director: Vedran Babić
  Head Coach: Drago Žiljak
  Assistant Coach: Marin Mišković
  Fitness Coach: Emil Baltić
  Fitness Coach: Dragan Marijanović
  Team Manager : Boris Konjuh

Youth academy
  Director: Damir Bogdanović 
  Coaching staff: Saša Sardelić, Matko Novaković, Nikola Mrđen & Ivan Marenčić
  First-team liaison officer: Nikola Mrđen 
  Head of goalkeeping: Valter Matošević
  Goalkeeper coach: Igor Saršon
  U-19 coach: Marin Mišković
  U-16 coach: Alen Kurbanović
  U-14 coach: Mateo Hrvatin
  U-10 coach: Milan Uzelac
Source: SportCom.hr

Notable former players 

  Stanko Jerger
  Simeon Kosanović
  Željko Kosanović
  Željko Tomac
  Ivan Munitić
  Vlado Vukoje
  Roberto Sošić
  Jurica Lakić
  Darko Srdoč
  Marijan Seđak
  Mladenko Mišković
  Željko Gašperov
  Boris Dragičević
  Boris Komucki
  Drago Žiljak
  Valter Periša
  Darko Dunato
  Željko Milanović
  Williams Černeka
  Valter Marković
  Damir Čavlović
  Ivica Rimanić
  Marin Mišković
  Tonči Peribonio
  Alvaro Načinović
  Valter Matošević
  Mladen Prskalo
  Darko Franović
  Valner Franković
  Irfan Smajlagić
  Zlatko Saračević
  Petar Misovski
  Dean Ožbolt
  Vladimir Šujster
  Robert Savković
  Ivan Vukas
  Mirza Džomba
  Renato Sulić
  Nikola Blažičko
  Milan Uzelac
  Edin Bašić
  Marko Bagarić
  Jakov Gojun
  Mateo Hrvatin
  Dario Černeka
  Ivan Pešić
  Ivan Stevanović
  Krešimir Kozina

Coaches 

  Josip Šarić (Sep 1957 – Jun 1964)
  Tomislav Mohorić☨ (Jul 1964 – Aug 1965)
  Mladenko Mišković (Aug 1965 – Apr 1966)
  Simeon Kosanović (Apr 1966 – Sep 1968) 
  Stanko Jerger (Sep 1969 – May 1970)
  Mladenko Mišković☨ (May 1970 – Jun 1979)
  Vjekoslav Sardelić (Jun 1979 – Mar 1980)
  Ivica Rimanić (Mar 1980 – Jan 1981)
  Jurica Lakić☨ (Feb 1981 – Jun 1981)
  Željko Tomac (Jun 1981 – Apr 1986)
  Marijan Seđak & Milan Blagovčanin (Apr 1986 – Aug 1987)
  Vjekoslav Sardelić, Mladenko Mišković & Milan Vučković (Sep 1987 – Jul 1988)
  Josip Šojat (Jul 1988 – Jun 1990)
  Damir Čavlović (Jul 1990 – 2 Aug 1991)
  Drago Žiljak (2 Aug 1991 – Oct 1992)
  Mladenko Mišković (interim) (Oct 1992 -Jan 1993)
  Darko Dunato (Jan 1993 – 1 Jun 1993)
  Drago Žiljak (1 Jun 1993 – 1 Aug 1994)
  Ivan Munitić (1 Aug 1994 – 23 Jun 1995) 
  Drago Žiljak (1 Jul 1995 – 1 Jul 1997) 
  Ivan Munitić (1 Jul 1997 – 10 Oct 1999)
  Damir Čavlović (10 Oct 1999 – 27 Feb 2003)
  Zlatko Saračević (27 Feb 2003 – 22 Mar 2004)
  Franko Mileta (22 Mar 2004 – 22 Dec 2004)
  Williams Černeka (interim) (22 Dec 2004 – 25 Jun 2005)
  Boris Dragičević (25 Jun 2005 – 27 Mar 2006)
  Mladen Prskalo (27 Mar 2006 – 7 Feb 2007)
  Drago Žiljak (7 Feb 2007 – 1 Aug 2009)
  Damir Čavlović (1 Aug 2009 – 1 Jul 2010)
  Alen Kurbanović (1 Jul 2010 – 28 Sep 2012)
  Igor Dokmanović (interim) (2 Oct 2012 – 9 Oct 2012)
  Irfan Smajlagić (9 Oct 2012 – 30 May 2013)
  Marin Mišković (30 May 2013 – 4 March 2017)
  Igor Marijanović (4 March 2017 – 28 January 2018)
  Drago Žiljak (29 January 2018 – 4 July 2018)
  Nedjeljko Lalić (4 July 2018 – 21 June 2019)
  Valter Matošević (10 July 2019 – )

Presidents

 1957–1968 – Vittorio Drog☨ 
 1968–1977 – Stanko Jerger 
 1977–1979 – Ivan Brnabić 
 1979–1980 – Fedor Pirović 
 1980–1983 – Drago Crnčević 
 1983–1985 – Petar Čarić☨ 
 1985–1986 – Zrinko Hlača 
 1987–1997 – Josip Rechner  
 1998–1999 – Milan Krmpotić 
 1999–2001 – Marko Markanović 
 2001–2003 – Miljenko Mišljenović 
 2003–2007 – Petar Bracanović☨ 
 2007–2014 – Zdravko Kolić 
 2014–present Vedran Devčić

Honours

European record

By competition

Source: eurohandball.com Last updated on 26 November 2016.Pld = Matches played; W = Matches won; D = Matches drawn; L = Matches lost; GF = Goals for; GA = Goals against. Defunct competitions indicated in italics.

Summary by ground

Source: eurohandball.com

By season

Player records
Most appearances in EHF club competitions: 27 appearances
Milan Uzelac
Top scorer in EHF club competitions:
Mateo Hrvatin

Rankings

EHF club coefficient ranking
(As of 30 April 2018), source: Eurotopteam website

Related clubs
ŽRK Zamet
HNK Rijeka
RK Pećine
RK Mornar Crikvenica
RK Kozala

References

External links
Official website of RK Zamet (Croatian)
Zamet Sport TV (Croatian)
Rukometni Klub Zamet Rijeka (Croatian)
European record  (English)

 
Croatian handball clubs
Handball clubs established in 1957
Sport in Rijeka
1957 establishments in Croatia